Nikita Botanical Garden (
) is one of the oldest botanical gardens in Europe. It is located in Crimea, close to Yalta, by the shores of the Black Sea. It was founded in 1812 and named after the settlement Nikita in Crimea, Russian Empire. 
Its founder and first director was Russian botanist Christian Steven of Swedish descent. The garden and its collections were greatly expanded by the Livonian Nicolai Anders von Hartwiss, director 1827–1860.

The total area is 11 square kilometres. It is a scientific research centre, a producer of saplings and seeds, and a tourist attraction.

The garden was the part of the Ukrainian Academy of Agrarian Sciences. It has subsidiaries in Crimea and Kherson Oblast. Its collection counts over 50,000 species, sorts and hybrides. Its scientific work consists in study of natural flora, collection of gene fund, selection and introduction of new agricultural plants for south Ukraine, Russia, and other countries.

Gallery 

Botanical gardens in Ukraine
Protected areas of Ukraine
Botanical research institutes
Research institutes in Ukraine
Research institutes in the Soviet Union
Tourist attractions in Crimea
Biota of Crimea
Buildings and structures in Yalta